This is a list of recipients of the Ihsan Doğramacı Family Health Foundation Prize awarded by World Health Organization (WHO).

Established in 1980 by Professor İhsan Doğramacı (1915–2010) to celebrate paediatricians and child health specialists who have given distinguished service in this field every two years. The prize consists of a gold-plated silver medal, a certificate, and an honorarium for services in the field of family health.

List of recipients

Ihsan Doğramacı Family Health Foundation Prize

Ihsan Doğramacı Family Health Foundation Fellowship

Child Health Foundation Fellowship

See also 

 List of Léon Bernard Foundation Prize laureates
 List of Sasakawa Health Prize laureates
 List of United Arab Emirates Health Foundation Prize laureates
 List of Sheikh Sabah Al-Ahmad Al-Jaber Al-Sabah Prize laureates
 List of Dr LEE Jong-wook Memorial Prize for Public Health laureates
 List of Dr A.T. Shousha Foundation Prize and Fellowship laureates
 List of The State of Kuwait Prize for the Control of Cancer, Cardiovascular Diseases and Diabetes in the Eastern Mediterranean Region laureates
 List of Jacques Parisot Foundation Fellowship laureates
 List of The Darling Foundation Prize laureates

References 

World Health Organization
Public health
Ihsan Doğramacı Family Health Foundation Prize laureates